Donald Ashley Gordon (born 3 October 1990) is an English cricketer.  Gordon is a right-handed batsman who bowls right-arm fast-medium.  He was born on the Isle of Wight and educated at Ryde School.

While studying for his degree in mathematics at Keble College, Oxford, Gordon made his first-class debut for Oxford MCCU against Lancashire in 2011.  He made two further first-class appearances for the team in that season, against Nottinghamshire and Sussex.  In his matches in 2011, he took 5 wickets at an average of 49.40, with best figures of 2/27.

References

External links
Donald Gordon at ESPNcricinfo
Donald Gordon at CricketArchive

1990 births
Living people
Sportspeople from the Isle of Wight
People educated at Ryde School with Upper Chine
Alumni of Keble College, Oxford
English cricketers
Oxford MCCU cricketers